Burna-Buriaš II, rendered in cuneiform as Bur-na- or Bur-ra-Bu-ri-ia-aš in royal inscriptions and letters, and meaning servant or protégé of the Lord of the lands in the Kassite language, where Buriaš (dbu-ri-ia-aš₂) is a Kassite storm god possibly corresponding to the Greek Boreas, was a king in the Kassite dynasty of Babylon, in a kingdom contemporarily called Karduniaš, ruling ca. 1359–1333 BC, where the Short and Middle chronologies have converged. Recorded as the 19th King to ascend the Kassite throne, he succeeded Kadašman-Enlil I, who was likely his father, and ruled for 27 years. He was a contemporary of the Egyptian Pharaohs Amenhotep III  and Akhenaten. The proverb "the time of checking the books is the shepherds' ordeal" was attributed to him in a letter to the later king Esarhaddon from his agent Mar-Issar.

Correspondence with Egypt

The diplomatic correspondence between Burna-Buriaš and the pharaohs is preserved in nine of the Amarna letters, designated EA (for El Amarna) 6 to 14. The relationship between Babylon and Egypt during his reign was friendly at the start,  and a marriage alliance was in the making. "From the time my ancestors and your ancestors made a mutual declaration of friendship, they sent beautiful greeting-gifts to each other, and refused no request for anything beautiful." Burna-Buriaš was obsessed with being received as an equal and often refers to his counterpart as "brother". They exchanged presents: horses, lapis-lazuli and other precious stones from Burna-Buriaš and ivory, ebony and gold from Akhenaten. On one occasion, Burna-Buriaš sent a necklace of lapis-lazuli by way of congratulation for the birth of Akhenaten's first child, the princess Meritaten.

But then things began to sour. On EA 10, he complains that the gold sent was underweight. "You have detained my messenger for two years!" he declares in consternation. He reproached the Egyptian for not having sent his condolences when he was ill and, when his daughter's wedding was underway, he complained that only five carriages were sent to convey her to Egypt. The bridal gifts filled 4 columns and 307 lines of cuneiform inventory on tablet EA 13.

Not only were matters of state of concern. "What you want from my land, write and it shall be brought, and what I want from your land, I will write, that it may be brought." But even in matters of trade, things went awry and, in EA 8, he complains that Egypt's Canaanite vassals had robbed and murdered his merchants. He demanded vengeance, naming Šum-Adda, the son of Balumme, affiliation unknown, and Šutatna, the son of Šaratum of Akka, as the villainous perpetrators.

In his correspondence with the Pharaohs, he did not hesitate to remind them of their obligations, quoting ancient loyalties:

Posterity has not preserved any Egyptian response, however, Abdi-Heba, the Canaanite Mayor of Jerusalem, then a small hillside town, wrote in EA 287 that Kassite agents had attempted to break into his home and assassinate him.

One letter preserves the apologetic response from a mārat šarri, or princess, to her mbé-lí-ia, or lord (Nefertiti to Burna-Buriaš?). The letters present a playful, forthright and at times petulant repartee, but perhaps conceal a cunning interplay between them, to confirm their relative status, cajole the provision of desirable commodities and measure their respective threat, best exemplified by Burna-Buriaš' feigned ignorance of the distance between their countries, a four-month journey by caravan. Here he seems to test Akhenaten to shame him into sending gold or perhaps just to gauge the extent of his potential military reach.

International relations

Diplomacy with Babylon's neighbor, Elam, was conducted through royal marriages. A Neo-Babylonian copy of a literary text which takes the form of a letter, now located in the Vorderasiatisches Museum in Berlin, is addressed to the Kassite court by an Elamite King. It details the genealogy of the Elamite royalty of this period, and from it we find that Pahir-Iššan married Kurigalzu I's sister and Humban-Numena married his daughter and their son, Untash-Napirisha was betrothed to Burna-Buriaš's daughter. This may have been Napir-asu, whose headless statue (pictured) now resides in the Louvre in Paris.

It is likely that Suppiluliuma I, king of the Hittites, married yet another of Burna Buriaš's daughters, his third and final wife, who thereafter was known under the traditional title Tawananna, and this may have been the cause of his neutrality in the face of the Mitanni succession crisis. He refused asylum to the fleeing Shattiwaza, who received a more favorable response in Hatti, where Suppiluliuma I supported his reinstatement in a diminished vassal state. According to her stepson Mursili II, she became quite a troublemaker, scheming and murderous, as in the case of Mursili's wife, foisting her strange foreign ways on the Hittite court and ultimately being exiled. His testimony is preserved in two prayers in which he condemned her.

Kassite influence reached to Bahrain, ancient Dilmun, where two letters found in Nippur were sent by a Kassite official, Ilī-ippašra, in Dilmun to Ililiya, a hypocoristic form of Enlil-kidinni, who was the governor, or šandabakku, of Nippur during Burna Buriaš's reign and that of his immediate successors. In the first letter, the hapless Ili-ippašra complains that the anarchic local Aḫlamû tribesmen have stolen his dates and "there is nothing I can do" while in the second letter they "certainly speak words of hostility and plunder to me".

Domestic affairs
Building activity increased markedly in the latter half of the fourteenth century with Burna-Buriaš and his successors undertaking restoration work of sacred structures.  Inscriptions from three door sockets and bricks, some of which are still in situ, bear witness to his restoration of the Ebabbar of the sun god Šamaš in Larsa. A tablet provides an exhortation to Enlil and a brick refers to work on the great socle of the Ekiur of Ninlil in Nippur. A thirteen line bilingual inscription can now probably be assigned to him. Neo-Babylonian temple inventory from Ur mentions him along with successors as a benefactor. A cylinder inscription of Nabonidus recalls Burna-Buriaš’ earlier work on the temenos at Sippar:

There are around 87 economic texts, most of which were found at successive excavations in Nippur, providing a date formula based on regnal years, which progress up to year 27. Many of them are personnel rosters dealing with servile laborers, who were evidently working under duress as the terms ZÁḤ, "escapee", and ka-mu, "fettered", are used to classify some of them. Apparently thousands of men were employed in construction and agriculture and women in the textile industry. An oppressive regime developed to constrain their movements and prevent their escape. Other texts include two extispicy reports provide divinations based on examination of animal entrails. Nippur seems to have enjoyed the status of a secondary capital. The presence of the royal retinue replete with scribes would have provided the means for the creation of business records for the local population.

Kara-ḫardaš, Nazi-Bugaš, and the events at the end of his reign

Later in his reign the emissaries of Assyrian king Aššur-uballiṭ I were received at the Egyptian court by Tutankhamen, who had by then ascended the throne. This caused a great deal of dismay from Burna-Buriaš who claimed the Assyrians were his vassals, "Why have they been received in your land? If I am dear to you, do not let them conclude any business. May they return here with empty hands!" on EA 9. With the destruction of Mitanni by the Hittites, Assyria emerged as a great power during his reign, threatening the northern border of the Kassite kingdom.

Perhaps to cement relations, Muballiṭat-Šērūa, daughter of Aššur-uballiṭ, had been married to either Burna-Buriaš or possibly his son, Kara-ḫardaš; the historical sources do not agree. The scenario proposed by Brinkman has come to be considered the orthodox interpretation of these events. A poorly preserved letter in the Pergamon Museum possibly mentions him and a princess or mārat šarri. Kara-ḫardaš was murdered, shortly after succeeding his father to the throne, during a rebellion by the Kassite army in 1333 BC. According to an Assyrian chronicle this incited Aššur-uballiṭ to invade, depose the usurper installed by the army, one Nazi-Bugaš or Šuzigaš, described as "a Kassite, son of a nobody", and install Kurigalzu II, "the younger", variously rendered as son of Burnaburiaš and son of Kadašman-Ḫarbe, likely a scribal error for Kara-ḫardaš. Note, however, that there are more than a dozen royal inscriptions of Kurigalzu II identifying Burna-Buriaš as his father.

Notes

References

14th-century BC Babylonian kings
Amarna letters writers
Kassite kings
14th-century BC rulers
Kings of the Universe